Human Powered Health may refer to:

Human Powered Health (men's team), a professional cycling team that competes on UCI Continental Tours
Human Powered Health (women's team), a professional cycling team that competes on the UCI Women's World Tour